Cross Street Chapel is a Unitarian church in central Manchester, England. It is a member of the General Assembly of Unitarian and Free Christian Churches, the umbrella organisation for British Unitarians. Its present minister is Cody Coyne.

History

The Act of Uniformity 1662 imposed state control on religion by regulating the style of worship in the Church of England. However, many clergy rejected the restrictions, and of the 2000 ministers who were ejected from the established church, Henry Newcome established his own congregation that same year. The "Dissenters' Meeting House" was opened in 1694 and holds a special place in the growth of nonconformism within the city.

In 2012, the chapel became the first place of worship to be granted a civil partnership licence when the law changed in England. During the construction of Manchester Metrolink's second city crossing in the City Zone, 270 bodies from what used to be the chapel's graveyard had to be exhumed and reburied. The work took place from 2014–17.

The Chapel
The building was renamed the Cross Street Chapel and became a Unitarian meeting-house c.1761. It was wrecked by a Jacobite mob in 1715, rebuilt and destroyed during a World War II air raid in December 1940. A new building was constructed in 1959 and the present structure dates from 1997. The Gaskell Room of the new building houses a collection of memorabilia of novelist Elizabeth Gaskell.

Notable ministry and congregation
Urban historian Harold L. Platt notes that in the Victorian period "The importance of membership in this Unitarian congregation cannot be overstated: as the fountainhead of Manchester Liberalism it exerted tremendous influence on the city and the nation for a generation."

Sir Thomas Baker
William Fairbairn
Elizabeth Gaskell
William Gaskell
James Heywood
Eaton Hodgkinson
James Kay-Shuttleworth, 1st Baronet
Henry Newcome
Thomas Potter
John Henry Reynolds
Thomas Worthington

List of ministers
Henry Newcome 1662–1695
John Chorlton 1687–1707
James Coningham 1700–1712
Eliezer Birch 1710–1717
Joseph Mottershead 1717–1771
Joshua Jones 1725–1740
John Seddon 1741–1769
Robert Gore 1770–1779
Ralph Harrison 1771–1810
Thomas Barnes 1780–1810
John Grundy 1811–1824
John Gooch Robberds 1811–1854
John Hugh Worthington 1825–1827
William Gaskell 1828–1884
James Panton Ham 1855–1859
James Drummond 1860–1869
Samuel Alfred Steinthall 1870–1893
Edwin Pinder Barrow 1893–1911
Emanuel L.H. Thomas 1912–1917
H. Harrold Johnson 1919–1928
Charles W. Townsend 1929–1942
F.H. Amphlett Micklewright 1943–1949
Fred Kenworthy 1950–1955
Reginald W. Wilde 1955–1959
Charles H. Bartlett 1960–1967
Kenneth B. Ridgway 1969–1971
E.J. Raymond Cook 1972–1987
Denise Boyd 1988–1996
John A. Midgley 1997–2008
Jane Barraclough 2008–2014
Cody Coyne 2014–present

References

Further reading

External links
Cross Street Chapel official site
The Gaskell Society official site

Churches in Manchester
History of Manchester
Unitarian chapels in England
Churches completed in 1997
17th-century Protestant churches